List of Ministers of Finance of Democratic Republic of the Congo since the independence of Republic of Congo:

Finance Ministers of the Republic of Congo
Pascal Nkayi, June 1960 - September 1960
Albert Ndele, September 1960 - February 1961
Arthur Pinzi, August 1961 - July 1962
Emmanuel Bamba, July 1962 - July 1964
Dominique Ndinga, July 1964 - October 1965
Jean-Joseph Litho, October 1965 - October 1967
Paul Mushiete, October 1967 - March 1968
Thomas Luango, March 1968 - August 1968
Victor Nendaka, August 1968 - August 1969
Namwisi ma Nkoy, August 1969 - September 1970
Albert Ndele, September 1970 - November 1970

Source:

Finance Ministers of Zaire
Baruti Wa Ndualu, February 1972 - January 1975
Charles Bofossa Wambea Nkosso, January 1975 - August 1977
Jules Croy Emony Mondanga, December 1977 - March 1979
Ngole Miki, March 1983 - January 1983
Tshishimbi Wa Bilenga, February 1985 - July 1985
Djamboleka Loma Patrice, July 1985 - October 1986
Mabi Mulumba, October 1986 - January 1987
Nyembo Shabani, January 1987 - July 1987
Kinzonzi Mwatukidi Ngindu, July 1987 - March 1988
Kamtatu Massamba Cléophas, March 1988 - October 1988
Katanga Mukumadi, October 1988 - May 1990
Bombito Botamba, May 1990 - March 1991
Munga Munkamba, March 1991- October 1991
Faustin Birindwa, October 1991
Ramazani Mwene, October 1991 - November 1991
Mwamba Mulunda, November 1991 - August 1992
Benoît Atale, August 1992 - December 1992
Mbonga Magalu, December 1992 - March 1993
Jules Fontaine Sambwa, March 1993 - April 1993
Célestin Tshibwabwa, April 1993
Jules Fontaine Sambwa, April 1993 - July 1994
Pierre Pay-Pay wa Syakasighe, July 1994 - February 1996
Gilbert Kiakwama kia Kiziki, February 1996 - December 1996
Marco Banguli, December 1996 - April 1997
Mashagiro Maba, April 1997 - May 1997
Kasereka Kasay, May 1997
Source:

Finance Ministers of the Democratic Republic of the Congo
Mawampanga Mwana Nanga, May 1997 - January 1998
Fernand Tala Ngay, January 1998 - March 1999
Mawampanga Mwana Nanga, March 1999 - November 2000
Jean Amisi Mutumbi, November 2000 - April 2001
Freddy Matungulu, April 2001 - February 2003
Léonard Luongwe, February 2003 - June 2003
Modeste Mutombo Kyamakosa, June 2003 - January 2005
André-Philippe Futa, January 2005 - November 2005
Marco Banguli, November 2005 - February 2007
Athanase Matenda Kyelu, February 2007 - February 2010
Augustin Matata Ponyo, February 2010 - April 2012
Patrice Kitebi, April 2012 - December 2014
Henri Yav Mulang, December 2014 - August 2019
José Sele Yalaghuli, August 2019 - April 2021
Nicolas Kazadi, April 2021 - Incumbent
Source:

See also 
 Economy of the Democratic Republic of the Congo

References

External links
Ministry Homepage

Government ministers of the Democratic Republic of the Congo

Economy of the Democratic Republic of the Congo